Cunningham House and Outbuildings, also known as Cunningham Farm, is a historic home located near Napier, Braxton County, West Virginia. The house dates to the 1830s, and is a two-story, log structure sided with white clapboards.  Also located on the property is a food cellar and granary.  The buildings are representative of traditional central West Virginia subsistence farming techniques.  The site was purchased by the Army Corps of Engineers during the development of Burnsville Lake, and is administered as part of the Bulltown Historic Area.

It was listed on the National Register of Historic Places in 1984.

See also
Union Civil War Fortification

References

External links
 Bulltown Historic Area - US Army Corps of Engineers

Historic house museums in West Virginia
Farms on the National Register of Historic Places in West Virginia
Houses on the National Register of Historic Places in West Virginia
Houses completed in 1830
Houses in Braxton County, West Virginia
National Register of Historic Places in Braxton County, West Virginia
Museums in Braxton County, West Virginia
1830 establishments in Virginia
Log buildings and structures on the National Register of Historic Places in West Virginia